Vlatko Lazić (born 1 May 1989) is a Dutch professional footballer who plays for as a left back for Jodan Boys.

Personal life
Lazić was born in Bodegraven. He is of Serbian descent.

Career
Lazić has played for Ajax, Dordrecht, RBC Roosendaal, KV Turnhout and De Graafschap. He signed for NAC Breda in July 2015.

In March 2019 it was confirmed, that Lazić would join DHSC from the upcoming 2019–20 season. At the end of February 2020 it was confirmed, that Lazic would join Jodan Boys in July 2020.

References

1989 births
Living people
Dutch footballers
Dutch expatriate footballers
Eerste Divisie players
Tweede Divisie players
AFC Ajax players
FC Dordrecht players
RBC Roosendaal players
KFC Turnhout players
De Graafschap players
NAC Breda players
FC Astra Giurgiu players
RKC Waalwijk players
FC Lienden players
GVVV players
CVV de Jodan Boys players
Dutch people of Serbian descent
Dutch people of Bosnia and Herzegovina descent
Serbs of Bosnia and Herzegovina
Dutch expatriate sportspeople in Belgium
Expatriate footballers in Belgium
Dutch expatriate sportspeople in Romania
Expatriate footballers in Romania
Expatriate footballers in Norway
People from Bodegraven
Association football fullbacks
Quick Boys players
Arendal Fotball players
Dutch expatriate sportspeople in Norway
DHSC players
Footballers from South Holland